Michael Coleman may refer to:

Arts and entertainment 
Michael Coleman (Irish fiddler) (1891–1945), Irish-American fiddler
Michael Coleman (blues musician) (1956–2014), American blues guitarist
T. Michael Coleman (born 1951), American bass player of bluegrass and folk music
Michael Coleman, English musician of Brian and Michael
Michael Coleman (author) (born 1946), English writer of books for children and young adults
Michael Coleman (dancer) (born 1940), British ballet dancer
Michael Coleman (The Walking Dead), a minor fictional character

Others 
Michael Coleman (bishop) (1902–1969), Anglican bishop
Michael Gower Coleman (1939–2011), Roman Catholic bishop of Port Elizabeth, South Africa
Michael Coleman (baseball) (born 1975), American outfielder
Michael Coleman (hurler) (born 1962), Irish retired hurler 
Michael B. Coleman (born 1954), American politician, former mayor of Columbus, Ohio

See also
Michael Colman (disambiguation)
Coleman (disambiguation)